Isabella Straub (born 14 August 1991) is a German sport shooter.

She participated at the 2018 ISSF World Shooting Championships.

References

External links

Living people
1991 births
German female sport shooters
ISSF rifle shooters
European Games competitors for Germany
Shooters at the 2019 European Games
21st-century German women